Mount Vernon High School could refer to:

Mount Vernon High School (Arkansas) — Mount Vernon, Arkansas
Mount Vernon High School (Illinois) — Mount Vernon, Illinois
Mount Vernon High School (Fortville, Indiana)
Mount Vernon High School (Mount Vernon, Indiana)
Mount Vernon High School (Iowa) — Mount Vernon, Iowa
Mount Vernon High School (Missouri) — Mount Vernon, Missouri
Mount Vernon High School (New York) — Mount Vernon, New York
Mount Vernon High School (Ohio) — Mount Vernon, Ohio
Mount Vernon High School (South Dakota) — Mount Vernon, South Dakota
Mount Vernon High School (Texas) — Mount Vernon, Texas
Mount Vernon High School (Virginia)
Mount Vernon High School (Washington) — Mount Vernon, Washington

See also
Mount Vernon (disambiguation)
Vernon (disambiguation)